Johannes Kristian Lahti (May 29, 1952 in Turku – March 1, 2017) was a male decathlete from Finland, who was nicknamed "Jonski". He set his personal best (8090 points) in 1978. Lahti became national champion in the decathlon in 1980 and 1982.

Achievements

References

External links 
sports-reference

1952 births
2017 deaths
Sportspeople from Turku
Finnish decathletes
Athletes (track and field) at the 1976 Summer Olympics
Athletes (track and field) at the 1980 Summer Olympics
Olympic athletes of Finland